This is a list of Brazilian television related events from 2007.

Events
3 April - Diego Gasques wins the seventh season of Big Brother Brasil.
17 June - Actor and model Rodrigo Hilbert and his partner Priscila Amaral win the fourth season of Dança dos Famosos.
16 August - Thaeme Mariôto wins the second season of Ídolos, becoming the show's only female winner. This was the last season to be broadcast on SBT.

Debuts
29 October - Vila Sésamo (1972-1977, 2007–present)

Television shows

1970s
Turma da Mônica (1976–present)

1990s
Malhação (1995–present)
Cocoricó (1996–present)

2000s
Big Brother Brasil (2002–present)
Dança dos Famosos (2005–present)
Ídolos (2006-2012)

Ending this year
Sítio do Picapau Amarelo (2001–2007)

Births

Deaths

See also
2007 in Brazil
List of Brazilian films of 2007